Norfolk County Council is the top-tier local government authority for Norfolk, England. Its headquarters are based in the city of Norwich.

Below it there are 7 second-tier local government district councils: Breckland District, Broadland District, Great Yarmouth Borough, North Norfolk District, Norwich City, King's Lynn and West Norfolk Borough, and South Norfolk District.

History

In 1902, the council consisted solely of landowners.

Chairmen of the council prior to 1974

1889-1902 Robert Gurdon, 1st Baron Cranworth

1902-1912 Sir William Browne-ffolkes

1912-1920 John Holmes 

1920-1925 Ailwyn Fellowes, 1st Baron Ailwyn

1925-1941 Russell Colman 

1941-1950 Sir Henry Upcher

1950-1966 Sir Bartle Edwards

1966-1969 Douglas Sanderson 

1969-1974 John Hayden  : From this point onwards the role of Chairman became ceremonial with the council being run by a Leader.

The council, as currently constituted, was established in 1974 following the implementation of the Local Government Act 1972, which replaced the two previous county authorities (the County Borough of Norwich and the County of Norfolk) with a single top tier authority for the whole of Norfolk.

Politics

Norfolk County Council is currently (since May 2016) run by a Conservative Administration.

Norfolk County Council has traditionally been known as a Conservative stronghold, being run by them from its formation until 1993.

For the period 1993 until 2001 no one party had overall control.

The Conservatives won a majority in the 2001 local elections and held the authority until 2013.

The countryside is almost all Conservative territory, with few areas being strong for the Liberal Democrats. The urban areas of Norfolk have always been more mixed in their loyalties, however, and seats in Norwich, Great Yarmouth, and King's Lynn are often held by the Labour Party. From 2009 to 2013 the Greens held the greatest number of Norfolk County Council electoral divisions within the city of Norwich.

Following the county elections of May 2013, Norfolk County Council was under no overall control, Norfolk County Council's ruling administration was made up of an alliance of non-Conservative councillors (14 UKIP, 15 Labour, 10 Liberal Democrat, 4 Green and 1 independent) with a Labour leader until May 2016. The alliance collapsed in May 2016 when the Green Party withdrew its support resulting in the Council electing a Conservative Leader, and that in turn lead to a minority Conservative administration running the council until May 2017.

In the Local Elections of May 2017 the Conservatives won an overall majority of the seats and were able to form a majority administration. The results were Conservative 55, Labour 17, Liberal Democrats 11 with both UKIP and the Green Party losing all their seats on the council.

In the Local Elections of May 2021 the Conservatives increased their number of seats to 58 and remained in control of the Council.

In April 2014 a project to establish an incinerator at King's Lynn was scrapped by the Labour lead alliance under George Nobbs when the members of the council voted by 48 to 30 to end the authority's contract with the firm Cory Wheelabrator after a heated debate at County Hall in Norwich on 7 April. That decision was directly followed by a cabinet meeting, in which the administration voted unanimously to axe the scheme. This decision meant the council had to pay compensation to the company of several million pounds.

In May 2018 just one week after being re-elected Leader of the council for a further year Cllr. Cliff Jordan resigned from his position and his seat on the council due to ill health. The following month at an Extraordinary Meeting of the Council Cllr. Andrew Proctor was elected Leader.

Election results

Economy and business
The council spends an average of £56.5 million a month with suppliers.

Education

See also List of schools in Norfolk

The council is in charge of all Nursery, Primary and Secondary state schools throughout Norfolk which are not academies, but not Tertiary education. There are three nursery schools, 359 primary schools, 35 secondary schools, one all-through school, one free school, one short stay school and 11 special schools.

The council provides a school finder for parents to find children a school. The primary school curriculum is set by the government, and recorded on Directgov. The secondary (high) school curriculum is set by the government, and recorded on Directgov. There are compulsory subjects which are needed to be followed in Norfolk and England.

In Year 9 (sometimes Year 8), children are required to pick their GCSE options for the forecoming year. In England, a student must take at least two optional choices.

In February 2013, Ofsted inspectors judged that vulnerable children in the county were at risk. Shortly afterwards, the regulator expressed concern about the county's educational provision. Three years later, in August 2016, Ofsted found that Norfolk County Council had still failed to address the regulator's earlier judgements (in February and August 2013, respectively) that the council's arrangements for the protection of children and for services for looked after children were 'inadequate'. In 2017 after further inspection the rating was raised to 'requires improvement' after considerable progress in the department.

Health and Social Care

The council is responsible for coordinating and managing the Adult Social Care of the population of Norfolk. This work was overseen by the Adult Social Care Committee based at County Hall. However, in May 2019 the committee was abolished and its responsibilities transferred to the Cabinet Member for Adult Social Care, Public Health and Prevention.

Since 2012 the Health and Wellbeing Board for Norfolk and Waveney has been responsible for Public Health in the county. The board has been chaired by Cllr. Bill Borrett since 2017, it comprises representatives from most NHS bodies such as the five Clinical Commissioning Groups and the three Norfolk Acute Hospitals as well as Norfolk and Waveney's County and District Councils.

See Healthcare in Norfolk for the details of the different NHS bodies charged with delivering health in the county.

Transportation

Norfolk County Council is responsible for maintaining Norfolk's  road networks and bus routes. They often go into schools and promote road safety to students.

Conservation

Norfolk County Council offered grant aid for landscape conservation, submitted to the Director of Planning and Transportation.
Many historic buildings in the county are protected by the Norfolk Historic Buildings Trust, established in 1977, which is under the guidance of the county council. Between 1995 and 2000, the Trust played a major role in restoring the Denver Mill site, at a cost of over £1 million.

Notable members
Steffan Aquarone
Walter Keppel, 9th Earl of Albemarle
Jack Boddy
Michael Carttiss
Judith Chaplin
Robert Chase
Richard Toby Coke
Sir Thomas Cook
Sidney Dye
George Edwards
John Garrett
Paul Hawkins
Dave Rowntree
William Benjamin Taylor
John Wodehouse, 2nd Earl of Kimberley
Albert Hilton, Baron Hilton of Upton
Lilias Rider Haggard

References

External links

 
County councils of England
Local education authorities in England
Local authorities in Norfolk
Major precepting authorities in England
Leader and cabinet executives